Catocala largeteaui is a moth in the family Erebidae first described by Charles Oberthür in 1881. It is found in China.

Subspecies
Catocala largeteaui largeteaui
Catocala largeteaui yunnana (Mell, 1936) (China: Yunnan)

References

External links
Original description: 

largeteaui
Moths described in 1881
Moths of Asia